Luan Shyqyri Skuqi (born October 25, 1951 in Kavajë) is a politician and former member of the Assembly of the Republic of Albania for the Democratic Party. He served as Minister of Education and Sports in 1997. He was in term 135 days.

References

Living people
Democratic Party of Albania politicians
Cabinet ministers from Kavajë
1951 births
Members of the Parliament of Albania
Parliament members from Kavajë
Government ministers of Albania
Education ministers of Albania
21st-century Albanian politicians
20th-century Albanian politicians